Howard Fieldstad Ahmanson Jr. (born February 3, 1950) is an American heir of a banking fortune. He is the son of Howard F. Ahmanson Sr., the founder of Home Savings Bank, the fortune of which Ahmanson Jr. is an heir. He writes on issues including housing affordability, land use, the abuse of eminent domain, and the rule of law.

Biography

Early life
Ahmanson was born on February 3, 1950. He is the son of Dorothy Johnston Grannis and the American financier Howard F. Ahmanson Sr. (1906–1968). His father was a prominent businessman in the savings and loan industry; Ahmanson, Sr. founded H.F. Ahmanson & Co., which thrived in the Great Depression and ultimately expanded throughout California and into New York state, Arizona and Florida. His father was well known for his support for the arts, an area in which the father and son share an interest. Howard Sr. found great pride in having a son, since he saw the opportunity to extend his own empire and legacy. Howard Sr. pursued a close relationship with his son, Howard Jr., whom he referred to as "Steady". Howard Jr. was intellectually inclined from a young age, reading by age three. He was quoted in a local newspaper about thermonuclear reactions at age eight.

His parents divorced when he was ten years old. Despite the trappings of wealth, Howard Jr. was a lonely child. He has said, "I resented my family background, [my father] could never be a role model, whether by habits or his lifestyle, it was never anything I wanted." His father died when he was eighteen, and Ahmanson Jr. inherited his father's fortune.

He attended Occidental College, where he obtained a degree in economics. He then toured Europe, but returned because of complications with arthritis. He earned a master's degree in linguistics at the University of Texas at Arlington. Ahmanson's language fluency in Spanish, German and Japanese are singular and uncommon triumphs over his Tourette syndrome.

In 1986, Howard married journalist Roberta Green, who supports him in spending his father's money and has a specific focus and concern for visual art. She assumes a more hands-on role within those endeavors, namely Bridge Projects in Los Angeles.

Monetary Contributions

Organizations and projects
Fieldstead and Company, Howard and Roberta Ahmanson's personal office, has a steady history of contributing parts of his father's inherited fortune to a plethora of organizations and initiatives. It is stated that the mission of Fieldstead and Company is to "make the world more like ... a place where there is no darkness, no sickness, no hunger or thirst, no slavery, no prisoners, no tears, no death". The following is a list of organizations to which the Ahmansons have contributed significant amounts in the past:  
American Anglican Council; Washington, D.C.
→Association of orthodox Episcopal churches, led by Rev. Canon David Anderson.
Biola University; La Mirada, California 
California Policy Center; Tustin, California
→Howard played a significant role in financially and intellectually supporting a publication, “With Friends Like These”, that was organized by the California Policy Center and served California elected officials by displaying a grounded case against crony corporate welfare in the state of California.
Calvin College; Grand Rapids, Michigan
→Roberta Ahmanson graduated from Calvin College in 1972.
Chalcedon Foundation; Vallecito, California
Chapman University; Orange, California
→By way of Fieldstead & Company, Howard has made possible a series of conferences and events predominantly focused on matters such as housing policy and urbanism, all held at Chapman University’s Wilkinson College for Arts, Humanities, and Social Sciences. These events have tackled conversations relevant to the Greater Los Angeles area, such as the future of transportation, the LA housing crisis, housing injustices, and the dwindling power of municipal governance/bodies.
Claremont Institute; Claremont, California
→Think tank seeking "to restore the principles of the American Founding to their rightful, preeminent authority in our national life."
Discovery Institute; Seattle, Washington
→Howard Ahmanson Jr. served on the board of directors for the Center for Science and Culture, a proponent for the intelligent design movement.
Drew University; Madison, New Jersey
→Founders of a team that published 28 volumes of the "Ancient Christian Commentary on Scripture."
Ethics and Public Policy Center (EPPC); Washington D.C.
→Think tank that view domestic and foreign policy issues from a Judeo-Christian point of view.
Food for the Hungry; Phoenix, Arizona
→Evangelical-based relief organization with annual budget of about $76 million and programs in 37 countries in the developing world.
Fullhart-Carnegie Museum Trust; Perry, Iowa
→The contribution funds a museum in the town of Perry, Iowa, in which Roberta Ahmanson grew up.
Hudson Institute; Washington, D.C.
International Fellowship for Mission as Transformation (INFEMIT USA); Washington, D.C. 
InterVarsity Christian Fellowship; Madison, Wisconsin
John & Vera Mae Perkins Foundation
Maranatha Trust; Washington, D.C.
Mariners Christian School; Costa Mesa, California
→Private school in Costa Mesa with about 650 students in preschool to eighth grade.
National Coalition for the Protection of Children and Families (formerly National Coalition Against Pornography); Cincinnati, Ohio. 
Orange County Classical Academy; Orange, California
→Orange County's only free tuition-free, K-12 Classical Education public charter school.
Orange County Rescue Mission; Santa Ana, California
→Howard and Roberta are active supporters of the Orange County Rescue Mission, an effort that turns impossibilities into possibilities for the lesser fortunate; predominantly serving those who suffer from abuse, addiction, and abandonment. The Orange County Rescue Mission provides housing, support, treatment, and opportunity for the betterment of those afflicted and forgotten.
Pepperdine University; Malibu, California
→Through his monetary contributions, Howard has utilized support panels and conferences held at Pepperdine University’s School of Public Policy. These events consisted of conversations around housing affordability and included a deep, varied unit of experts on housing policy in the Greater Los Angeles area.
St. James Anglican Church; Newport Beach, California
→Formerly "St. James Episcopal Church", the Ahmansons have attended the "evangelical church with charismatic roots."
CityGate (Formerly "Sen USA"); Hobart, Indiana
→Evangelical Christian missionary group working in Central and Eastern Europe.
Strong Towns; Brainerd, Minnesota
→Howard has made possible events put on by Strong Towns, a think tank and community that encourages Americans and Canadians, alike, to rethink the way municipal infrastructure is developed and sustained in their respective communities. Fieldstead & Company have been generous in making it possible for Strong Towns to bring their community together for an in-person gathering to learn from active policy experts, policymakers, and researchers around sustaining municipal infrastructure.
Voice of OC; Santa Ana, California
→Fieldstead & Company has generously supported Voice of OC, a startup nonprofit newsroom founded by Norberto Santana, Jr. Troubled by the corruption he discovered in modern journalism, Santana started Voice of OC as an initiative to cover matters that empower, not exploit, the citizens within Orange County.
World Vision; Washington, D.C.

Howard has previously served as a board member for both the John & Vera Mae Perkins Foundation and the Claremont Institute. Ahmanson is a major supporter of the Discovery Institute, whose Center for Science and Culture supports ideas centered around intelligent design. Through Fieldstead, Ahmanson's wife Roberta, a former religion reporter and editor for the Orange County Register, has funded and been directly involved with some programs of the Council for Christian Colleges and Universities, including the Washington Journalism Center that encompasses both the Summer Institute of Journalism, and the Fieldstead Journalism Lectures. Fieldstead has funded other Christian journalistic projects such as Gegrapha and GetReligion. A common thread in all of these organizations is Terry Mattingly, a personal friend of Roberta Ahmanson, who directs the Washington Journalism Center at the Council for Christian Colleges and Universities, teaches journalism, and writes a weekly column for the Scripps-Howard News Service. Roberta Ahmanson recently co-edited a book called Blind Spot. Howard and Roberta are also supporters of The Media Project, an organization that "educates journalists on the importance of religion" and its digital magazine, Religion Unplugged. The Ahmansons have also supported the creation of the 29-volume Ancient Christian Commentary on Scripture, published by InterVarsity Press.

Social advocacy and political involvement
Ahmanson was a major advocate for the property owners and tenants exploited in the abuses by California redevelopment agencies, especially concerned about the widespread abuse of eminent domain and public subsidies to private businesses which he views as perversely incentivising cronyism to the detriment of those with the least money and influence. He financed the publication "Redevelopment: The Unknown Government" and the formation of Municipal Officials for Redevelopment Reform (MORR), alongside Chris Norby, California legislator and former mayor of Fullerton, California, in 1995. Norby later served in the California State Assembly when redevelopment agencies were abolished in 2011 and MORR was disbanded, having succeeded in its sole purpose.

Ahmanson was a registered Republican until 2008; Ahmanson, worried about the narrowing focus of the California Republican Party on lowering taxes, announced that he switched parties and was a registered Democrat from 2008 to 2018. Finding fault with both parties, he is now officially registered as a "No Party Preference" (NPP) voter (formerly referred to as a decline-to-state voter by the state of California). In the 2020 presidential election Ahmanson voted for and endorsed Brian Carroll of the American Solidarity Party.

Until March 2023, Ahmanson was the sole funder of Rod Dreher's employment writing for The American Conservative. He reportedly pulled the funding which provided Rod Dreher a six-figure salary after reading an article that Rod published in The American Conservative describing in detail his experience of seeing a man's uncircumsized penis, calling it a "primitive root weiner". Ahmanson was reported saying of this article, "This is too weird", and “I don’t want to read this or pay for this anymore.”

Time magazine included the Ahmansons in their 2005 profiles of the 25 Most Influential Evangelicals in America, classifying them as "the financiers." In the 1970s, Howard became a board member of the Chalcedon Foundation and served until 1996. In 1996, he said he had left the Chalcedon board due to the fact that he "did not embrace" all of the teachings held by its leadership.

In 2004, the Ahmansons let the Orange County Register do a five-part series on them to give the public a more accurate view of their work and beliefs.

Howard has contributed in numerous ways to different groups that exist to serve communities, better local schools, and to solve the housing crisis. The following is a list, not exhaustive, of entities that Ahmanson has made significant contributions to in the past:
Protect Our Homes Coalition
Food for the Hungry (Thailand, Ecuador, Philippines and Zimbabwe)
Harambee Christian Preparatory School (Pasadena, California)
Victims of war in Nagarno-Karabagh
Music education for schools in Orange County
Western Center for Law and Religious Freedom

Holding a strong interest and passion in the activity of standup paddleboarding, Howard has assumed a role of activism alongside FreeSUP SoCal in opposition to a particular determination made by the United States Coast Guard (USCG) that has been used to require operators of standup paddleboards to wear a personal flotation device (PFD). FreeSUP SoCal maintains that a leash is the more common and frequently most effective safety equipment, as evidenced by its widespread usage and the sport's significantly diminished mortality rate compared to other water sports. In 2014, the organization that would come to be known as FreeSup SoCal and which receives funding by Ahmanson, offered a formal, public comment to the USCG that explained how the PFD determination which was intended to promote safety for standup paddleboarders sorely lacked data justifying the determination, and that making determinations without the necessary data could have the opposite effect of putting paddleboarders in peril.

Arts and humanities

Organizations
Howard has made numerous contributions and offered support for art initiatives across Los Angeles and Orange County. The following is a collection of organizations and projects in the arts & humanities that have benefited from the support of Howard Ahmanson, Jr.
Bridge Projects
Stanley Spenser: An English Vision installment at the Hirshhorn Museum, Washington, D.C.
The Sacred Made Real
Visual Commentary on Scripture (VCS)
Caravaggio: The Final Years at the National Gallery, London
Pacific Symphony Youth Orchestra
Ancient Christian Commentary on Scripture, published by InterVarsity Press
The Palace of Fine Arts in San Francisco
The Museum of Contemporary Art in Mexico City

Howard's charitable contributions have supported the arts community, namely the Los Angeles County Museum of Art, with his donation of View of Vétheuil, a work by the French Claude Monet, Scene of Judgement, by the Italian Marco Zoppo, and works by Auguste Rodin.

Bridge Projects
Bridge Projects is a LA-based art gallery that consists of a community of artists, scholars, and collectors who are inspired by art history, spirituality, living religious traditions, and contemporary art practices. Roberta, wife of Ahmanson and current chair of Bridge Projects, founded the gallery and community with LA based artist, Linnea Spransy, back in 2017. While Howard played a supportive role in bringing this project to fruition, Roberta spearheaded the vision for Bridge Projects, which has featured a number of progressive art installations, such as: 
"10 Columns," an immersive light installation created by prominent Southern California artist, Phillip K. Smith III(active:10/12/19-2/16/20).
 “A Composite Leviathan,” a two-part exhibition created by a collection of emerging Chinese artists (active: 9/12/20-2/27/21).
“To Bough and To Bend,” an exhibition of many artists using trees as imagery for discussions around ecological issues (active: 03/11/20-07.25/20).

Personal life
Ahmanson lives with Tourette syndrome. His primary residence is in Newport Beach, CA.

References

External links 
The Ahmanson Foundation
Howard Ahmanson, Board of Directors (Discovery Institute)
Ahmanson's Blog

1950 births
Living people
Occidental College alumni
University of Texas at Arlington alumni
Discovery Institute fellows and advisors
American Anglican Church in North America members
Dominion theology
Intelligent design advocates
People with Tourette syndrome
Christians from California
Fellows of King's College London